Magnolia is an unincorporated community in Crawford County, Indiana, in the United States. Magnolia was platted in 1838. A post office was established at Magnolia in 1848, and remained in operation until it was discontinued in 1937.

References

Unincorporated communities in Crawford County, Indiana
Unincorporated communities in Indiana